Tunisian protests may refer to: 
Tunisian Revolution in 2010
2013–14 Tunisian political crisis
2016 Tunisian protests
2018 Tunisian protests
2021 Tunisian protests